Perkins House is a historic home located near Newton, Catawba County, North Carolina. It was built about 1790, and is a two-story, three bay Federal  style brick dwelling. It features a hip-roof porch and a very wide, double shoulder chimney with flared headers.  The interior woodwork was removed by the Museum of Early Southern Decorative Arts, Old Salem.

It was listed on the National Register of Historic Places in 1974.

References

Houses on the National Register of Historic Places in North Carolina
Houses completed in 1790
Federal architecture in North Carolina
Houses in Catawba County, North Carolina
National Register of Historic Places in Catawba County, North Carolina